The Milk River Hills,  el. , is a set of hills east of Fort Peck, Montana in McCone County, Montana.

See also
 List of mountain ranges in Montana

Notes

Mountain ranges of Montana
Landforms of McCone County, Montana